Oleksandr Mashchenko (born 15 November 1985) is a paralympic swimmer from Ukraine who competes in category S11 events and specializes in the breaststroke.

Mashchenko has won the 100m breaststroke at three consecutive Paralympics, first in three Paralympics firstly in 2000, then  record time in 2004 and a third time in 2008. At the 2000 games he also competed in the 50m and 100m freestyle where he failed to make the finals, the 200m individual medley finishing sixth and was part of the 4 × 100 m medley team that finished fourth.  For the 2004 games the medley team improved enough that Mashchenko was part of the team that broke the world record to win gold, Mashchenko also picked up a bronze in the 200m individual medley, finished eighth in the 50m freestyle, seventh in the 100m backstroke and qualified for the final of the 100m butterfly. In addition to his 100m breaststroke gold in 2008 he also won a silver in the 100m butterfly behind Spaniard Enhamed Enhamed who set a new world record, finished eighth in the 50m freestyle and sixth in the 100m backstroke.

References

External links
 

1985 births
Living people
Ukrainian male breaststroke swimmers
Paralympic swimmers of Ukraine
Paralympic gold medalists for Ukraine
Paralympic silver medalists for Ukraine
Paralympic bronze medalists for Ukraine
Paralympic medalists in swimming
S11-classified Paralympic swimmers
Swimmers at the 2000 Summer Paralympics
Swimmers at the 2004 Summer Paralympics
Swimmers at the 2008 Summer Paralympics
Swimmers at the 2012 Summer Paralympics
Medalists at the 2008 Summer Paralympics
Medalists at the 2012 Summer Paralympics
Medalists at the 2000 Summer Paralympics
Medalists at the 2004 Summer Paralympics
Medalists at the World Para Swimming Championships
Medalists at the World Para Swimming European Championships
Ukrainian male freestyle swimmers
Ukrainian male butterfly swimmers
Ukrainian male medley swimmers
21st-century Ukrainian people